Multiscale turbulence is a class of turbulent flows in which the chaotic motion of the fluid is forced at different length and/or time scales. This is usually achieved by immersing in a moving fluid a body with a multiscale, often fractal-like, arrangement of length scales. This arrangement of scales can be either passive or active

As turbulent flows contain eddies with a wide range of scales, exciting the turbulence at particular scales (or range of scales) allows one to fine-tune the properties of that flow. Multiscale turbulent flows have been successfully applied in different fields., such as:
 Reducing acoustic noise from wings by modifying the geometry of spoilers;
 Enhancing heat transfer from impinging jets passing through grids;
 Reducing the vortex shedding intensity of flows past normal plates without changing the shedding frequency;
 Enhancing mixing by energy-efficient stirring;
 Improving flow metering and flow conditioning in pipes;
 Improving combustion.

Multiscale turbulence has also played an important role into probing the internal structure of turbulence. This sort of turbulence allowed researchers to unveil a novel dissipation law in which the parameter  in

 

is not constant, as required by the Richardson-Kolmogorov energy cascade. This new dissipation law characterises non-equilibrium turbulence apparently universally in various flows (not just multiscale turbulence) and results from non-equilibrium unsteady energy cascade. This imbalance implies that new mean flow scalings exist for free shear turbulent flows, as already observed in axisymmetric wakes

References

Chaos theory
Turbulence
Fluid dynamics